is a Japanese film editor, known as editor of Nagisa Oshima's and Shuji Terayama's films in her young days. She is the director of Tokyo Filmex, a film festival.

Selected filmography
 God Speed You! Black Emperor (ゴッド・スピード・ユー! BLACK EMPEROR, 1976)
 Grass Labyrinth / Kusa-meikyū (草迷宮, 1979–1983)
 Merry Christmas, Mr. Lawrence (戦場のメリークリスマス, 1983) - 1983 Cannes Film Festival
 Maborosi (幻の光, 1995) - 52nd Venice International Film Festival
 Falling Into the Evening (落下する夕方, 1998) - 48th Berlin International Film Festival
 Taboo (御法度, 1999) - 2000 Cannes Film Festival
 Dead Run (疾走, 2005) - 56th Berlin International Film Festival
 The Harimaya Bridge (The Harimaya Bridge はりまや橋, 2009)

References

External links
 大島ともよ - Japanese Movie Database (ja)
 

Japanese film editors
1949 births
Living people
People from Akita Prefecture